The 1943 Saint Mary's Gaels football team was an American football team that represented Saint Mary's College of California during the 1943 college football season. In their second season under head coach James Phelan, the Gaels compiled a 2–5 record and were outscored by opponents by a combined total of 126 to 93.

The team was led on offense by Herman Wedemeyer, who was selected as a first-team halfback on the 1943 All-Pacific Coast football team. In 1979, Wedemeyer was inducted into the College Football Hall of Fame.

Schedule

References

Saint Mary's
Saint Mary's Gaels football seasons
Saint Mary's Gaels football